Princess Catherine Radziwiłł (30 March 1858 – 12 May 1941) was a Polish-Russian aristocrat. Born in Russia into the Polish-Lithuanian House of Rzewuski, her maternal family was the Russian Dashkov-Vorontsov family. In 1873 she married the Polish-Lithuanian Prince Wilhelm Radziwiłł.

She was a prominent figure  at the Imperial courts in Germany and Russia, but became involved in a series of scandals. She combined her love for the luxury of the courts, social life, gossip and intrigue with her literary talent and she wrote two dozen books on European royalty and the Russian court, including Behind the Veil at the Russian Court (1914) and her autobiography It Really Happened (1932).

Family and early life 
Princess Catherine Radziwiłł was born in St. Petersburg as Ekaterina Adamovna Rzewuska, a member of the House of Rzewuski, a Polish family of warriors, statesmen, adventurers and eccentrics. She was the only child of the Russian General Adam Adamowicz Rzewuski (1801—1888), who took part in the Crimean War, and his second wife, Anna Dmitrievna Dashkova (1831-1858), a daughter of the writer Dmitry Dashkov, Tsar Nicholas I's minister of justice. Catherine's mother belonged to some of Russia's most notable families: Dashkov, Stroganov, Pashkov and Vasilchikov. She died while giving birth to her. Catherine's father married for a third time and provided her with three half-brothers, including Stanislaw Rzewuski, who became a novelist and literary critic. The Rzewuski was a family of notable writers, including Catherine's great-great-grandfather, Wacław Rzewuski; her uncle, Henryk; and her aunts,
Ewelina, wife of Honoré de Balzac, and Karolina, who kept a literary salon in Paris.

Catherine was educated under the supervision of her stern father in his large estates in central Ukraine. Although the Rzewuski family originated in the Polish–Lithuanian Commonwealth, Catherine had no attachment to Poland and considered herself Russian.

On 26 October 1873, at age 15, she married Prince Wilhelm Radziwiłł (1845–1911), son of Prince Wilhelm Radziwill (1797-1870) and Countess Mathilde von Clary und Aldringen (1806-1896), who was a Polish officer in the Prussian army. The couple moved to Berlin to live with his family. She had seven children, four sons and three daughters. Two of her sons died in early childhood, but the other five children (Louise, Wanda, Gabriela, Nicholas and Casimir) reached adulthood. Little is known about Radziwiłł's marriage except what she wrote in her memoirs: Her husband treated her kindly, but she felt bored and frustrated. The couple became prominent at the court in Berlin.

Literary career 

In 1884, Nouvelle Revue published a series of articles written as letters to a young diplomat by the elderly Count Paul Vasili. The articles were critical of Berlin society and full of damaging gossip about the imperial court. The publication of the articles, collected in the book Berlin Society, created a great scandal at the court.  Count Paul Vasili was a fictional character and a subsequent investigation indicated Auguste Gérard, the empress' French reader, as the author. Only in 1918 in her book Confessions of the Czarina, Radziwiłł admitted that she was the author of Berlin Society. The confusion was aggravated as other anonymous writers also began to use the pen-name Count Paul Vasili.

After the publication of Berlin Society, Radziwiłł began to be seen with suspicion in Berlin. When her father died in Russia in April 1888, Radziwiłł decided to stay in St. Petersburg where her youngest son, Casimir, was born the same year. At the Russian court, Princess Radziwiłł had a prominent position. She became a friend and admirer of Konstantin Pobedonostsev. Her political leanings being very liberal in Berlin, turned to staunchly conservative in Russia. She also began an affair with General Peter Alexander Cherevin, court commandant, head of the Third Section of the Okhrana, and one of Tsar Alexander III's few trusted friends. During the late 1880s and early 1890s, Princess Radziwiłł reached the pinnacle of her life and of her influence at the court. Her situation suffered a sharp downturn with the deaths of Tsar Alexander III in 1894 and of her lover Cherevin in early 1896. Estranged from her husband and children, she moved to London and earned some money writing articles for hungry American magazines and newspapers chronicling British society, but she accumulated debts.

Cecil Rhodes and Radziwill initially became friends in Cape Town, but Rhodes, who some writers and academics have suggested, was homosexual, pulled away from her and ignored her persistent correspondence.

Starting in July 1900, Radziwill had an affair with an unsuspecting building contractor associate of Rhodes, Harry Hindle, the son of James Hindle Masons of Sheffield, who was subcontracted on the construction of the Cape Town City Hall in 1900. Unaware that Radziwill was secretly married with children (as anyone else knew of in Cape Town), Harry invited Radziwill on a hunting expedition with friends including his literary friend, Charles Payne in Aug.1900. (Photo of expedition available.) James & Harry Hindle had ongoing building projects at Groote Schuur and Rhodes' cottage at Muizenberg, among others. (James and Harry were both at the cottage when Rhodes died, 26.Mar.1902). The relationship with Radziwill likely occurred due to Hindle’s building projects at the Rhodes Estate, the Cape Town Castle and the City Hall, and where she assumed James and Harry’s association with Rhodes might be a useful playing card in her favour. She got more than she bargained for when she fell pregnant and the relationship ended in Dec.1900 at her home "Crail" in Kenilworth. To conceal her situation Radziwill left "Crail" and took up residence at a small house at Kalk Bay near Simons Town in Feb.1901 until her child, Alexi, was born in July 1901 of this liaison. It was during this time at Kalk Bay when Radziwill was most desperate financially and when her largest promissory notes were forged. One note for £4500- was forged 03.Apr.1901, another £6300- and another for £2000- forged, 03.Jul.1901, and so on. Radziwill was in serious financial trouble.  

Prior to her second arrival to Cape Town in Feb.1900, a scandal in London involving debts accumulated by her son Nicholas had sent her scurrying back to the Cape. However, that did not keep Radziwiłł from again becoming a news item:Princess Radziwill who was charged with having forged bills for large amounts up to £6000- on Mr. Rhodes was arrested on the 24.Sept.1901 for fraud but released on £114- bail the same day (someone secretly paid the bail - Rhodes or Hindle?) until she was charged in the Supreme Court of the Cape Colony. In her own evidence, she stated that she had received the bills signed in blank by Mr. Rhodes from Mrs. Scholtz but there appear[sic] to be no doubt that she forged the bills and then attempted to prevent action being taken by threats of publishing correspondence which she alleged was of a compromising nature of Mr.Rhodes and Lord Milner. Her methods were, as the Attorney-General Thomas L. Graham Esq. described them, the ordinary armoury of the blackmailer: and she had made use of her social position for purposes of intrigue and fraud. She was a fine specimen of the lady adventurer of detective fiction and we may expect her reappearance in a roman à clef dealing with South Africa. Her Solicitors, SilberBauer, Wahl & Fuller failed to convince the jury of her innocence in the 24 counts of fraud against her, including the forging of Rhodes' name/signature. 

Radziwiłł was sentenced after three days of trial, 14.Nov.1901 to two years at the Roeland Prison (without hard labour) where she occupied herself in writing but was released 14.Mar.1903. She was fortunate enough to end up spending only 16 months in prison for her crimes. It is not known what happened to little Alexi during her stay in prison. After her release from prison, she left the country and never returned. Alexi grew up in New York but eventually turned up in Durban, South Africa in 1971 seeking contact with his father Harry, who had recently died in Jan.1971. He met his half-siblings, Ralph Henry and Ruth Louisa for the first time.

In 1904 her memoir, My Recollections was published in London and New York with some level of success. Her youngest son, Casimir, however, had died while she was in prison and her estranged husband finally divorced her in 1906. In 1909, she married Karl Emile Kolb-Danvin, a Swedish engineer and entrepreneur. The couple settled in St. Peterburg, where her son Nicholas was serving in the Russian army. She published two more books, Behind the Veil of the Russian court, under her pen name Paul Vasili, and Memoirs of Forty Years (1914), a second autobiographical book. During World War I, her son was killed in the Eastern front in November 1914. Radziwiłł and her husband moved to Stockholm, where she was living at the outbreak of the Russian revolution. In a four-year span, she published a dozen books. She was on a visit to the United States when her second husband died, and she decided to stay in America.

She settled in New York City where she spent the rest of her life. Radziwiłł played a major role in exposing The Protocols of the Elders of Zion. In 1921, she gave a private lecture in New York in which she claimed that the Protocols were compiled in 1904–1905 by Russian journalists Matvei Golovinski and Manasevich-Manuilov at the direction of Pyotr Rachkovsky, chief of the Okhrana, the Russian secret service in Paris. Golovinski worked together with Charles Joly (son of Maurice Joly) at Le Figaro in Paris. This account, however, contradicts the basic chronology of the Protocols publication as they already had been published in 1903 in the Znamya newspaper. Moreover, in 1902, Rachkovsky was dismissed from the Paris Okhrana and returned to St. Petersburg. Radziwiłł's statements were cited during the Berne Trial by Russian witnesses in 1934 and by experts in 1935; they gave evidence that her date of 1905, when Matvei Golovinski would have shown her a manuscript of The Protocols of the Elders of Zion ("with a big blue ink spot on the first page") in Paris, is obviously an error of chronology, possibly caused by a typo in her article published in The American Hebrew and reprinted by The New York Times.

Works
 La Société de Berlin: augmenté de lettres inédites. 1884 as Paul Vasili
 La Société de Saint-Pétersbourg: augmenté de lettres inédites. 1886 as Paul Vasili
 La Sainte Russie; la cour, l’armée, le clergé, la bourgeoisie et le peuple. 1890 as Paul Vasili
 The Resurrection of Peter. A Reply to Olive Schreiner, 1900. [in response to Schreiner’s book Trooper Peter Halkett of Mashonaland (1897)] 
 My Recollections, 1904 
 Behind the Veil at the Russian Court, 1914.
 The Royal Marriage Market of Europe, 1915. 
 The Austrian Court From Within, 1916 
 Sovereigns and Statesmen of Europe, 1916 
 Because it was Written, 1916 [fiction] 
 The Black Dwarf of Vienna, and other weird stories, 1916 
 Germany under Three Emperors, 1917 
 Russia's Decline and Fall: The Secret History of a Great Debacle, 1918 
 Rasputin and the Russian Revolution, 1918 
 Cecil Rhodes, man and empire-maker, 1918
 Confessions of the Czarina, 1918
 The Firebrand of Bolshevism; The True Story of the Bolsheviki and the Forces That Directed Them, 1919 
 Secrets of Dethroned Royalty, 1920 
 Those I Remember, 1924 
 The Intimate Life of the Last Tsarina, 1929
 Child of Pity: The Little Prince [the Tsarevitch] Rides Away, 1930 
 Nicholas II: The Last of the Tsars, 1931 
 The Taint of the Romanovs, 1931 
 It Really Happened; An Autobiography by Princess Catherine Radziwiłł, 1932 
 The Empress Frederick, 1934

See also
The Protocols of the Elders of Zion

References

External links
 
 
 Works by Catherine Radziwill in English (readable online)
 

19th-century Polish women writers
1858 births
1941 deaths
Catherine
Protocols of the Elders of Zion
Russian people of Polish descent
Polish people of Russian descent
Cecil Rhodes
20th-century Polish women writers
20th-century memoirists